Thyestes, A Tragedy is a 1680 tragedy by the English writer John Crowne. It was originally staged by the King's Company at the Theatre Royal, Drury Lane. The original cast is unknown. It is based on Thyestes by Seneca.

References

Bibliography
 Jenkinson, Matthew. Culture and Politics at the Court of Charles II, 1660-1685. Boydell & Brewer, 2010.
 Van Lennep, W. The London Stage, 1660-1800: Volume One, 1660-1700. Southern Illinois University Press, 1960.
 White, Arthur Franklin. John Crowne: His Life and Dramatic Works. Routledge,  2019.

1680 plays
West End plays
Tragedy plays
Historical plays
Plays by John Crowne
Plays based on works by Euripides
Adaptations of works by Seneca the Younger